Antonio Calegari (17 February 1757, in Padua – 22 or 28 July 1828) was an Italian classical composer. His oratorio La risurrezione di Lazzaro 1779, was recorded under Filippo Maria Bressan in 2000.

He is to be distinguished from three other composers called Calegari from Padua; Father Francesco Antonio Calegari (d.1742), and Giuseppe Calegari, composer of a Betulia liberata (1771). and his own nephew Luigi Antonio Calegari.

Another contemporary of the same name, was born in Brescia in 1699 and died on July 15, 1777.

References

External links
 

Italian composers
Italian male composers
1828 deaths
1757 births
Musicians from Padua